Lycée Janson de Sailly is a lycée located in the 16th arrondissement of Paris, France. The lycéens of Janson are called les jansoniens and they usually refer to their high school as Janson, or JdS. It is the biggest academic institution in the region: 3,200 boys and girls from 11 to 20 attend classes ranging from junior high school to Classes Préparatoires.

History
Monsieur Janson de Sailly was a wealthy Parisian lawyer, who found out that his wife had a lover. Therefore, he decided to disinherit her and to bequeath all of his fortune to the State, under the condition that it be used to establish a modern high school that would offer an excellent education and in which no women would be allowed.

The lycée was built in the 1880s. Victor Hugo who lived nearby made a speech for the inauguration. A decade later it was opened to girls as well. The lycée Janson de Sailly was the first Republican lycée of France (the others started as royal or imperial establishments); it aimed at training the future French scientific, literary, military, industrial, diplomatic and political male élites of the young Third Republic.

It gained a national reputation, and attracted students from around the country. It also became one of the lycées of Parisian high society. The motto of the lycée was Pour la Patrie, par le livre et par l'épée (For the Homeland, by the book and by the sword). Many alumni joined the military, and participated in the conquest of the French Colonial Empire, especially in Africa.

In 1944, a few hundred Jansonians managed to leave the lycée and joined the French Free Forces (the 1st Army of Jean de Lattre de Tassigny): they founded le 2ème Bataillon de Choc, also known as Bataillon Janson-de-Sailly. They faced the German divisions in Alsace (especially in the battles of Masevaux and Colmar) during the counter-attack of Ardennes, and entered Germany with General Patton's forces in 1945.

Commemorative plaques near the entrances of several classrooms and halls in the school buildings honor the memories of its alumni - including the war hero Roland Garros.

Teaching
Nowadays, the 3,200 students are equally divided into the three traditional formations of the French Education System : collège (30 classes with collégiens from 11 to 14), lycée (30 classes with lycéens from 14 to 18) and Classes Préparatoires aux Grandes écoles or prépas (30 classes with students from 18 to 20).

In France, students must study two foreign or regional languages. The first choice at Janson is English or German. The second choice foreign language is: English, German, Spanish, Italian, Chinese or Russian. In classes préparatoires, there is even more choice with German, English, Arabic, Spanish, Italian, Russian as first language and all the aforementioned languages plus Japanese and Chinese as a second language. A student in Classes préparatoires can also take another second language not amongst those above. But those languages are available only through a partnership (the "Langues Inter-établissement") with other lycées with a wilder range of languages. The student would then study at Janson but go to another lycée to attend its foreign language class. For instance, the lycée Montaigne provides Portuguese and Polish and the lycée Buffon offers Hebrew and Swedish.
 
The Lycée offers an AbiBac section, with German history classes taught by a native speaker. The students taking part in the section will take the Abitur and the Baccalauréat exams at the end of 12th grade.

Ranking
Due to its geographical location, and to the number of its important alumni, Janson de Sailly has a high reputation. Its scholastic ranking puts it at or above the median for area schools. According to the sociologists Michel Pinçon and Monique Pinçon-Charlot the school is predominantly attended by children from the upper class or from the aristocracy because of its location (the prestigious 16th arrondissement of Paris).

Noted alumni

Politics and government
 Jacques Attali (born 1943), political adviser
 Robert Badinter (born 1928), French Minister of Justice
 Jean-Louis Bianco (born 1943), French Minister of Transport
 Édouard Bonnefous (1907-2007), French Minister of Commerce
 Jean-Louis Borloo (born 1951), French Minister of Ecology
 Élisabeth Borne (born 1961), Prime Minister of France
 Pierre Brossolette (1903-1944), member of the French Resistance
 Olivier Dassault (born 1951), French MP
 Bernard Debré (born 1944), French Minister of Development
 Laurent Fabius (born 1946), Prime Minister of France
 Edgar Faure (1908-1988), Prime Minister of France
 Olivier Giscard d'Estaing (born 1927), French MP
 Valéry Giscard d'Estaing (born 1926), President of France
 Bruno Gollnisch (born 1950), MEP
 Prince Peter of Greece and Denmark (1908-1980)
 Jean-Marcel Jeanneney (1910-2010), French Minister of Justice
 Lionel Jospin (born 1937), Prime Minister of France
 Ibrahim Boubacar Keïta (born 1945), President of Mali
 Patrick Leclercq (born 1938), Minister of State of Monaco
 Philippe Malaud (1925-2007), French Minister of Information
 Martin Malvy (born 1936), French Minister of Budget
 Lennart Meri (1929-2001), President of Estonia
 Frédéric Mitterrand (born 1947), French Minister of Culture
 Édouard Philippe (born 1970), Prime Minister of France
 Jean Sainteny (1907-1978), French Minister of Veteran Affairs
 Maurice Schumann (1911-1998), French Minister of Foreign Affairs
 Jean-Jacques Servan Schreiber (1924-2006), French Minister of Reform
 Mohammed Zahir Shah (1914-2007), King of Afghanistan

Military
 François d'Astier de la Vigerie (1886–1956), French General
 Henri Honoré d'Estienne d'Orves (1901-1941), member of the French Resistance
 Pierre Marie Gallois (1911-2010), French General
 Roland Garros (1888-1918), military aviator
 Jacques Lanxade (born 1934), French admiral

Science
 Élie Cartan (1869-1951), mathematician
 Jean Favard (1902-1965), mathematician
 Jean Baptiste Perrin (1870-1942), physicist, Nobel Prize in Physics laureate
 Laurent Schwartz (1915-2002), mathematician, Fields Medalist
 Jean-Claude Sikorav (born 1957), mathematician
 Hervé This (born 1955), chemist

Humanities
 Philippe Ariès  (1914-1984), historian
 Pierre Assouline (born 1953), essayist
 Claude Aveline (1901-1992), essayist
Jacques Barzun (1907-2012), historian
 Alain Bernheim (1931–2022), essayist
 Pierre Bertaux (1907-1986), scholar
 Laurent-Emmanuel Calvet (born 1969), economist
 Jean Daujat (1906-1998), philosopher
 Régis Debray (born 1940), philosopher
 Alain Decaux (1925-2016), historian
 Charles Du Bos (1882-1939), essayist
 Émile Faguet (1947-1916), essayist
 François Furet (1927-1997), historian
 Bertrand Gille (1920-1980), historian
 Paul Guth (1910-1997), essayist
 Henri Lepage (born 1941), economist
 Claude Lévi-Strauss (1908-2009), anthropologist
 Maurice Merleau-Ponty (1908-1961), philosopher
 Matthieu Ricard (born 1946), buddhist monk
 George Steiner (born 1929), essayist
 Benjamin Stora (born 1950), historian
 Jean Wahl (1888-1974), philosopher

Arts
 Richard Anthony (1920-2006), singer
 Gilbert Amy (born 1936), composer and conductor
 Claude Autant-Lara (1901-2000), film director
 Christian Bérard (1902-1949), designer
 Richard Berry (born 1950), actor
 Sinclair (born 1970), singer
 Carla Bruni-Sarkozy (born 1967), singer and model
 Emmanuel Carrère (born 1957), writer
 Roger Chastel (1897-1981), painter
 René Crevel (1900-1935), writer
 Jean-Loup Dabadie (born 1938), writer
 Pierre Daninos (1913-2005), writer
 Michel Déon (1919-2016), writer
 Jean Dutourd (1920-2011), writer
 Franc-Nohain (1872-1934), writer
 Jean Gabin (1904-1976), actor
 José Giovanni (1923-2004), film director
 Julien Green (1900-1998), writer
 Sacha Guitry (1885-1957), film director
 Georges Hugnet (1906-1974), graphic artist
 Sébastien Izambard (born 1973), singer
 Pierre Klossowski (1905-2001), writer
 Philippe Labro (born 1936), writer
 Jacques de Lacretelle (1888-1985), writer
 Georges Lautner (1926-2013), film director
 Michel Leiris (1901-1990), writer
 Roger Martin du Gard (1881-1958), writer, Nobel Prize in Literature laureate
 Robert Merle (1908-2004), writer
 Oscar Milosz (1877-1939), writer
 Henry de Montherlant (1895-1972), writer
 Philippe Noiret (1930-2006), actor
 Germain Nouveau (1851-1920), writer
 Gérard Oury (1919-2006), film director
 Jean Piat (born 1924), actor
 Raymond Roussel (1877-1933), writer
 Jean-Christophe Rufin (born 1952), writer
 Preston Sturges (1898-1959), film director
 Paul Vaillant-Couturier (1892-1937), writer
 Ray Ventura (1908-1979), jazzman
 Pierre Wiazemsky (1949 - ), press caricaturist (signing as 'Wiaz')

Business
 Bernard Attali (born 1943), CEO of Air France
 François-Marie Banier (born 1947), Liliane Bettencourt's adviser
 Vincent Bolloré (born 1952), billionaire, CEO of Bolloré
 Cyril Bourlon de Rouvre (born 1945), businessman
 Martin Bouygues (born 1952), billionaire, CEO of Bouygues
 Serge Dassault (born 1925), billionaire, CEO of Dassault Group
 Arnaud Lagardère (born 1961), CEO of Lagardère Group
 Robert Louis-Dreyfus (1946-2009), owner of the Olympique de Marseille
 Raoul Nordling (1881-1962), businessman
 Ernest-Antoine Seillière (born 1930), head of the MEDEF
 J. R. D. Tata (1904–1993), chairman of Tata Group
 Léon Zitrone (1914-1995), TV host

Sports
 Robert Abdesselam (1920-2006), tennis player
 William Grover-Williams (1903-1945), racing driver

Sister schools 
 Hangzhou Foreign Language School

Yeouido Girls Highschool

References

External links

  

 
Buildings and structures in the 16th arrondissement of Paris
1880s establishments in France